The PSA World Series 2013 is a series of men's squash tournaments which are part of the Professional Squash Association (PSA) World Tour for the 2013 squash season. The PSA World Series tournaments are some of the most prestigious events on the men's tour. The best-performing players in the World Series events qualify for the annual 2013 PSA World Series Finals tournament. Ramy Ashour won his first PSA World Series Squash Finals trophy, beating Mohamed El Shorbagy in the final.

PSA World Series Ranking Points
PSA World Series events also have a separate World Series ranking.  Points for this are calculated on a cumulative basis after each World Series event. The top eight players at the end of the calendar year are then eligible to play in the PSA World Series Finals.

2013 Tournaments

World Series Standings 2013

Bold – The first eight players present for the final

See also
PSA World Tour 2013
WSA World Series 2013
Official Men's Squash World Ranking

References

External links 
 World Series Series Squash website 

PSA World Tour seasons
2013 in squash